The Community Catholic Church of Canada (CCCC), is an Old Catholic denomination with its episcopal see based in Niagara-on-the-Lake, Ontario.

References
 http://www.communitycatholicchurch.com/faq.htm

External links
 

Old Catholicism in Canada
Independent Catholic denominations